The conte cruel is, as The A to Z of Fantasy Literature by Brian Stableford states, a "short-story genre that takes its name from an 1883 collection by Villiers de l'Isle-Adam", although previous examples had been provided by such writers as Edgar Allan Poe. Some critics use the label to refer only to non-supernatural horror stories, especially those that have nasty climactic twists, but it is applicable to any story whose conclusion exploits the cruel aspects of the 'irony of fate.' The collection from which the short-story genre of the conte cruel takes its name is Contes cruels (1883, tr. Sardonic Tales, 1927) by Villiers de l'Isle-Adam. Also taking its name from this collection is Contes cruels ("Cruel Tales"), a two-volume set of about 150 tales and short stories by the 19th-century French writer Octave Mirbeau, collected and edited by Pierre Michel and Jean-François Nivet and published in two volumes in 1990 by Librairie Séguier. 

Some noted writers in the conte cruel genre are Charles Birkin, Maurice Level, Patricia Highsmith and Roald Dahl, the latter of whom originated Tales of the Unexpected. H. P. Lovecraft observed of Level's fiction in his essay Supernatural Horror in Literature (1927): "This type, however, is less a part of the weird tradition than a class peculiar to itself—the so-called conte cruel, in which the wrenching of the emotions is accomplished through dramatic tantalizations, frustrations, and gruesome physical horrors".

Brian M. Stableford has observed that, by the 1980s, the conte cruel was the standard narrative form of soft science fiction, in particular the works of Thomas M. Disch and John Sladek.

See also
Conte (literature)

 Anthology
 Drabble
 Flash fiction (also called microfiction)
 Irish short story
 Literary journal
 Minisaga
 Sketch story
 Tall tale
 Vignette

References

Fiction forms
Literature
Short story types